Augusta Charlotte Cornelie Roszmann (1859-1945) was a Belgian artist.

Biography 
Rossmann was born on 1 September 1859 in Ghent. She studied in Paris at the Académie Julian. Her teachers included William-Adolphe Bouguereau, Gustave Boulanger, Jules Joseph Lefebvre, and Tony Robert-Fleury.  Rossmann exhibited her work at the Palace of Fine Arts at the 1893 World's Columbian Exposition in Chicago, Illinois. She died in 1945 in Ghent. Her work is in the collection of the Kunstmuseum Basel.

Gallery

References

External links
 
 Inspired by Her – Augusta Roszmann article by Iris Kretzschmar on the Kunstmuseum Basel website

1859 births
1945 deaths
Artists from Ghent
19th-century Belgian women artists
20th-century Belgian women artists